The men's track time trial in Cycling at the 2004 Summer Olympics was a time trial race in which each of the 17 cyclists from 13 nations attempted to set the fastest time for four laps (1 kilometre) of the track. Nations were limited to two cyclists each. The event was won by Chris Hoy of Great Britain, the nation's second consecutive victory in the men's track time trial (moving Great Britain into a five-way tie for second-most all-time at two). Arnaud Tournant of France earned silver after a disappointing fifth-place finish four years earlier. Stefan Nimke put Germany on the podium for the second consecutive Games with his bronze.

Background

This was the 19th appearance of the event, which had previously been held in 1896 and every Games since 1928. It was also the last appearance, as the event was cancelled to make room on the programme for BMX events.

The returning cyclists from 2000 were silver medalist Stefan Nimke of Germany, bronze medalist (and 1992 silver medalist and 1996 competitor) Shane Kelly of Australia, fifth-place finisher Arnaud Tournant of France, sixth-place finisher Dimitrios Georgalis of Greece, and seventh-place finisher Grzegorz Krejner of Poland. Georgalis and Krejner had competed in 1996 as well. The field included every world championship winner since 1995: Kelly (1995, 1996, 1997), Tournant (1998, 1999, 2000, 2001), Chris Hoy of Great Britain (2002, 2004), and Nimke (2003). Tournant also held the world record.

For the only time in the event's history, no nations made their debut. France made its 19th appearance, the only nation to have competed at every appearance of the event.

Competition format

The event was a time trial on the track, with each cyclist competing separately to attempt to achieve the fastest time. Each cyclist raced one kilometre from a standing start.

Records

The following were the world and Olympic records prior to the competition.

Arnaud Tournant broke the Olympic record with a time of 1:00.896. Stefan Nimke and Shane Kelly also beat the old Olympic record, but raced after Tournant and did not beat his new mark. Chris Hoy, racing last, did beat Tournant's mark with a new record of 1:00.711.

Schedule

All times are Greece Standard Time (UTC+2)

Results

In a fascinating event the Olympic Record was broken four times, the final time by Chris Hoy of Great Britain retaining the title for his country that Jason Queally had won in Sydney four years previously.

See also
Track time trial
Cycling at the 2004 Summer Olympics – Women's track time trial
Cycling at the 2008 Summer Olympics – Men's BMX

References

External links
Official Olympic Report

M
Cycling at the Summer Olympics – Men's track time trial
Track cycling at the 2004 Summer Olympics
Men's events at the 2004 Summer Olympics